Nnenna Njoku-Mbanu (born 18 March 1955) is a Nigerian athlete. She competed in the 1972 Summer Olympics, representing Nigeria in 4 × 100 metres Relay, Women, women's high jump and the women's shot put.

References

External links
 

1955 births
Living people
Athletes (track and field) at the 1972 Summer Olympics
Nigerian female high jumpers
Nigerian female shot putters
Olympic athletes of Nigeria
Place of birth missing (living people)
African Games medalists in athletics (track and field)
African Games silver medalists for Nigeria
Athletes (track and field) at the 1973 All-Africa Games
21st-century Nigerian women
20th-century Nigerian women